NextMedia Group was an out-of-home media company headquartered in Greenwood Village, Colorado.  NextMedia owns and operates 33 AM and FM stations, 5,700 outdoor advertising display across several regions and markets, as well as an interactive division.

History 
The company first started as Pinnacle Broadcasting. In 1999 it was announced that it would be rebranded as NextMedia Group.

In July 2004, NextMedia Group purchased the Wilmington, NC stations WRQR, WAZO, and WMFD from Ocean Broadcasting, and WKXB and WSFM from Sea-Comm Inc.

The Company failed to offer shares to investors in 2003, and stopped reporting its quarterly financial reports to the Securities and Exchange Commission during the third quarter of 2003, at which time it reported a long term debt obligation of some 300 million dollars; 200 million dollars of long term debt was refinanced in 2006.  Co Founder of the Company, Carl Hirsch, left in 2007 to become a founding partner of GoodRadio LLC based in West Palm Beach, FL. NextMedia Group was then owned by several private equity firms.

In the mid-late 2000s, NextMedia acquired outdoor displays in the Myrtle Beach, SC area from Clear Channel Outdoor, marking Clear Channel's OOH exodus from South Carolina.

In 2008 NextMedia Group announced to sell Wilmington, NC stations to Capitol Broadcasting Company.

NextMedia Group filed for Chapter 11 bankruptcy protection on December 21, 2009, which transfers 95% of equity in the company to second-lien holders.

On May 27, 2010 NextMedia emerged from Chapter 11 Bankruptcy protection.

On October 10, 2013, NextMedia Group announced all 33 of their radio stations, and presumably NextMedia 360, had been sold to Dean Goodman's Digity, LLC. The transaction was consummated on February 10, 2014, at a purchase price of $85 million.

Former radio stations
Stations are listed by state and market below. Station self-designated titles are denoted in quotations where applicable followed by actual cities of license and format in parentheses followed by frequency and effective radiated power.  For AM stations, both daytime and nighttime power are listed.

California

San Jose
KBAY (San Jose, Adult Contemporary) - 94.5 MHz, 44 kW
KEZR (San Jose, Hot Adult Contemporary) - 106.5 MHz, 42 kW

Illinois

Aurora
WERV "95.9 The River" (Aurora, Classic Hits) - 95.9 MHz, 3 kW

Joliet
WCCQ (Crest Hill, Country) - 98.3 MHz, 3 kW
WJOL (Joliet, News/Talk/Sports) - 1340 kHz,  1/1 kW
WSSR "Star 96.7" (Joliet, Hot AC) - 96.7 MHz, 3.5 kW
WRXQ (Coal City, Classic Rock) - 100.7 MHz, 2.45 kW

Waukegan
WKRS (ESPN DEPORTES 1220, Waukegan, Spanish Sports/Talk) - 1220 kHz, 1/0.09 kW
WXLC (102.3 WXLC Waukegan, Hot AC) - 102.3 MHz, 3 kW

Michigan

Saginaw
WCEN 94.5 the Moose www.945themoose.com (Hemlock, Country) - 94.5 MHz, 100 kW
WGER  Mix 106.3 www.mix1063fm.com (Saginaw, Hot Adult Contemporary)- 106.3 MHz, 4 kW
WSGW  NewsRadio 790 WSGW www.wsgw.com (Saginaw, News/Talk)- 790 kHz, 5/1 kW
WSGW-FM  Talk and Sports 100.5 www.fmtalk1005.com (Carrollton, News, Talk, Fox Sports)100.5 MHz, 3 kW
WTLZ  Hot 107 www.hotwtlz.com (Saginaw, Urban AC)107.1 MHz, 4.9 kW

North Carolina

New Bern
WANG (Havelock, Standards) - 1330 kHz,  1/ kW

Jacksonville
WQSL (Jacksonville, Country) - 92.3 MHz,  22.5 kW  (WQSL and WQZL currently simulcast)
WQZL (Belhaven, Country) -  101.1 MHz,  31 kW (WQSL and WQZL currently simulcast)
WXQR (Jacksonville, Active Rock) - 105.5 MHz,  19 kW
WLGD (Now WRMR, Modern Rock) (Wilmington, Spanish language) - 98.7 MHz,  100 kW

Kinston
WRNS (Kinston, Country) - 960 kHz,  5/1 kW  (WRNS and WRNS-FM currently simulcast)
WRNS-FM (Kinston, Country) - 95.1 MHz,  100 kW  (WRNS and WRNS-FM currently simulcast)

Southport

 WAZO  (Wilmington, Contemporary Hit Radio) - 107.5 MHz,   75 kW

Wilmington

 WILT (Now WYHW, Christian Radio) (Wilmington, Adult contemporary) - 104.5 MHz,  17 kW
 WMFD (ESPN WILMINGTON RADIO 630, Wilmington, Sports talk) - 630 kHz, 0.8/1 kW
 WKXB (Wilmington, Rhythmic Oldies) - 99.9 MHz,  26 kW 
 WSFM (sold to Sea-Comm Media and renamed WSFM to WUIN) (Wilmington, Modern rock) - 98.3 MHz,  18.5 kW

Washington

WERO (Washington,  Contemporary Hit Radio) - 93.3 MHz, 100 kW

Ohio

Canton
WHBC News/Talk 1480 WHBC www.whbc.com (Canton, News/Talk) - 1480 kHz, 15/5 kW
WHBC-FM Mix 94.1 www.mix941.com (Canton, Hot Adult Contemporary) - 94.1 MHz, 45 kW

South Carolina

Myrtle Beach
WKZQ-FM (Forestbrook, Alternative rock) - 96.1 MHz, 100 kW
WMYB (Myrtle Beach, CHR) - 92.1 MHz, 94 kW
WRNN (Myrtle Beach, Sports) - 1450 kHz, 1/1 kW
WRNN-FM (Socastee, News/Talk) - 99.5 MHz, 21.5 kW
WYAV (Myrtle Beach, Classic Rock) - 104.1 kHz, 100 kW

Texas

Sherman/Denison
KMKT (Bells, Country) - 93.1 MHz, 6.8 kW
KLAK (Tom Bean, Adult Contemporary) - 97.5 MHz, 32 kW
KMAD-FM (Whitesboro, Classic Rock) - 102.5 MHz, 18 kW

Wisconsin

Kenosha
WIIL (Kenosha, Mainstream Rock) - 95.1 MHz, 50 kW
WLIP (Kenosha, Oldies) - 1050 kHz, 0.25/0.25 kW

Websites

NextMedia owns and operates coupon and deals websites Rocketgrab.com (serving their radio markets) and CouponCrab.com (serving the Myrtle Beach, SC area) created by the interactive arm NextMedia 360.

External links

References

Defunct radio broadcasting companies of the United States
Companies based in Greenwood Village, Colorado
Private equity portfolio companies